Stenosfemuraia is a genus of Venezuelan cellar spiders that was first described by M. A. González-Sponga in 1998.  it contains only three species, found only in Venezuela: S. cuadrata, S. parva, and S. pilosa.

See also
 List of Pholcidae species

References

Araneomorphae genera
Pholcidae
Spiders of South America